Rogue for Hire is a 1960 TV series created by Seton I. Miller starring Neville Brand.

Cast
Neville Brand
Jerome Thor

References

External links

American adventure television series
1960 American television series debuts
1961 American television series endings
English-language television shows